A reel is an object around which lengths of another material are wound for storage.

Reel may also refer to:
 Reel (dance), a type of dance and its accompanying music
 Reel (horse), a thoroughbred racehorse and prolific broodmare
 Reel (people), an ethnic group of Sudan
 Reel language, or Atwot, a Nilotic language of South Sudan that is closely related to Nuer
 Reel (poetry collection), a collection of poetry by George Szirtes
 The Reels, an Australian rock pop group
 Reel Cinemas, a cinema chain in the United Arab Emirates
 Reel Cinemas (UK), a cinema chain in the United Kingdom
 Reel Corporation, an Australian film distributor
 Reel Theatres, a cinema chain in the USA
 Fishing reel, a device used on a fishing rod to wind the fishing line up
 Showreel, a piece of video or film footage that displays an actor's work
 KQZR-FM "The Reel", a Colorado radio station 
 Reel, a part of a slot machine
 Reelz, an American television network
 Instagram Reels, a video making feature on Instagram

See also
 Leica reel, a type of storyboarding device in animation
 Réel, a 2009 album by Kery James
 Reel Life (disambiguation)
 Reel-to-reel

Language and nationality disambiguation pages